Way Out West is a 1937 Laurel and Hardy comedy film directed by James W. Horne, produced by Stan Laurel, and distributed by Metro-Goldwyn-Mayer. It was the second picture for which Stan Laurel was credited as producer.

Plot
Stan (Stan Laurel) and Ollie (Oliver Hardy) have been entrusted to deliver the deed of a gold mine to the deceased prospector's daughter Mary Roberts (Rosina Lawrence). Mary works for her cruel unofficial guardians, Brushwood Gulch saloon owner Mickey Finn (James Finlayson) and his saloon-singer wife, Lola Marcel (Sharon Lynn), who have her trapped in a life akin to that of a slave by forcing her to do all the chores.

Stan and Ollie are traveling towards Brushwood Gulch; Stan on foot, leading a mule (called Dinah) dragging a travois, on which Ollie lies. As they ford a river, the travois detaches from the mule, leaving Ollie stranded in the water. He starts to wade then completely disappears into a sink hole in the river bottom. They hitch a ride on a stagecoach and attempt to flirt with a woman passenger (Vivien Oakland). Upon arriving in Brushwood Gulch, she complains to her husband (Stanley Fields), who threatens the pair by coldly informing them that they will be leaving in a hearse if they do not catch the next coach out of town.

At Mickey Finn's saloon, The Avalon Boys are performing on the front porch and Stan and Ollie dance to their music. Inside, they clumsily reveal their supposedly secret mission to Mickey, including the fact that they have never seen Mary before. On Mickey's suggestion, Lola pretends to be Mary and hijacks the deed from the boys, who then sing "The Trail of the Lonesome Pine" with the Avalon Boys. On their way out, Stan and Ollie encounter the real Mary, realize their mistake, and try to retrieve the deed from the couple, resulting in an extended chase and struggle. The Finns prevail and lock the deed in their safe when Lola gets the best of Stan with tickle torture. Ollie is briefly relieved by the arrival of the sheriff only to realize the sheriff is the angry husband who threatened them earlier, and who now forces them to leave town by running for their lives. Crossing the river, Ollie drops into the sink hole again.

Drying Ollie’s clothes that night, the pair resolve to return under the cover of darkness to retrieve Mary’s deed. After a series of mishaps (including the mule being belayed onto a balcony and Stan stretching Ollie's neck three feet as he tries to free him from a trapdoor), they finally manage to break into the saloon, where Stan finds Mary and explains the situation to her; she decides to run away with them. Mickey discovers them, but Ollie manages to grab Mickey's shotgun and force him at gunpoint to give the deed back to them. Mary, Ollie, Stan, and the mule make their getaway, trapping Mickey and Lola inside their own saloon by locking the front gate and entangling Mickey's head in the gate grill. Outside the town, the happy trio decide to head South to Mary's hometown and sing "I Want to Be in Dixie" as they begin their journey. When they ford the river, Ollie falls back into the sink hole.

Cast
 Stan Laurel as Stanley
 Oliver Hardy as Ollie
 Sharon Lynn as Lola Marcel (credited as Sharon Lynne)
 James Finlayson as Mickey Finn
 Rosina Lawrence as Mary Roberts
 Stanley Fields as Sheriff
 Vivien Oakland as Sheriff's wife
 The Avalon Boys as themselves
 Dinah the mule as herself
Uncredited:
 Harry Bernard as man eating at bar
 Flora Finch as Maw
 Mary Gordon as Cook
 Jack Hill as Finn's employee
 Sam Lufkin as stagecoach baggage handler
 Fred Toones as Janitor
 May Wallace as Cook
 James C. Morton as Bartender

Soundtrack
The film's score was composed by Marvin Hatley and nominated for an Academy Award for Best Music (Scoring). The film includes two well-known songs: firstly Macdonald and Carroll's "Trail of the Lonesome Pine", sung by Laurel and Hardy (except for a few lines by Chill Wills and Rosina Lawrence, lip-synched for comedic effect by Laurel), and secondly J. Leubrie Hill's "At the Ball, That's All", sung by the Avalon Boys and accompanied by Laurel and Hardy performing an extended dance routine, one that they rehearsed endlessly.

"Trail of the Lonesome Pine" was released as a single in Britain in 1975, backed by "Honolulu Baby" from Sons of the Desert; it reached number 2 in the British charts.

In popular culture
 Way Out West is referenced in the 1979 film The Sheriff and the Satellite Kid when the Sheriff (Bud Spencer) ends up replicating Stan Laurel's thumb fire trick featured in the film.
 The opening scene of the 2018 biopic Stan & Ollie depicts a shooting of the film, with Laurel and Hardy arriving on the set for one of the dance scenes.
 The original BBC version of "Song of Summer", Ken Russell's 1968 biopic of Frederick Delius, begins with Eric Fenby (Christopher Gable) anachronistically playing cinema organ accompaniment to a silent showing of the "Commence to Dancin'" dance episode. It was cut from the 2001 DVD release, as permission could not be obtained to use it.

References
Notes

Bibliography

External links

 
 
 
 
 
 Way Out West at Trailers from Hell

1937 films
1930s Western (genre) comedy films
American Western (genre) comedy films
American black-and-white films
Films directed by James W. Horne
Laurel and Hardy (film series)
Metro-Goldwyn-Mayer films
Films with screenplays by Charley Rogers
Films with screenplays by Felix Adler (screenwriter)
1937 comedy films
1930s English-language films
1930s American films